Rowing at the 2010 Asian Games was held in International Rowing Centre, Guangzhou, China from November 14 to 19, 2010. The host nation China dominated the competition winning all ten possible gold medals.

Schedule

Medalists

Men

Women

Medal table

Participating nations
A total of 201 athletes from 19 nations competed in rowing at the 2010 Asian Games:

References

Rowing Site of 2010 Asian Games

 
2010 Asian Games events
Asian Games
2010